Zagorica nad Kamnikom is a settlement on the right bank of the Kamnik Bistrica River in the Municipality of Kamnik in the Upper Carniola region of Slovenia.

Name
The name of the settlement was changed from Zagorica to Zagorica nad Kamnikom in 1953. In the past the German name was Sagoritz.

Church

The Stranje parish church, dedicated to Saint Benedict, is built on a small hill at the southern end of the settlement. The chapel of Our Lady of the Snows on the Big Pasture Plateau also belongs to this parish.

References

External links
Zagorica nad Kamnikom on Geopedia

Populated places in the Municipality of Kamnik